Tamás Kulifai (born 4 May 1989) is a Hungarian sprint canoeist. He won a silver medal at the 2012 Summer Olympics in the K-4 1000 m event, with Zoltan Kammerer, David Toth and Daniel Pauman. In June 2015, he competed for Hungary at the inaugural European Games, again in the Men's K-4 1000m sprint canoe, with the same team.  The team earned a gold medal.

Awards and honours

Orders and special awards
   Order of Merit of Hungary – Knight's Cross (2012)

References

External links

1989 births
Hungarian male canoeists
Living people
Canoeists at the 2012 Summer Olympics
Olympic canoeists of Hungary
Olympic silver medalists for Hungary
Olympic medalists in canoeing
ICF Canoe Sprint World Championships medalists in kayak
Medalists at the 2012 Summer Olympics
Canoeists from Budapest
European Games medalists in canoeing
European Games gold medalists for Hungary
Canoeists at the 2015 European Games
21st-century Hungarian people